Tom Reid is a New Zealand former rugby league footballer who represented New Zealand in the 1960 World Cup.

Playing career
Reid played for the West Coast and in 1960 was selected to represent the New Zealand national rugby league team at the 1960 World Cup.

In 1961 Reid moved to Auckland and joined the Glenora Bears club in the Auckland Rugby League competition. He played for Auckland in their 13-8 victory over Australia that year and played in his second, and final, test match for the Kiwis.

References

Living people
New Zealand rugby league players
Year of birth missing (living people)
New Zealand national rugby league team players
West Coast rugby league team players
Glenora Bears players
Auckland rugby league team players
Rugby league props